Dangers may refer to:
 Dangers, Eure-et-Loir, a commune in north-central France
 Dangers (band), American hardcore punk band
 Jack Dangers (born 1965), English musician

See also
 Danger (disambiguation)